Sanduleak -69 202 (Sk -69 202, also known as GSC 09162-00821) was a magnitude 12 blue supergiant star, located on the outskirts of the Tarantula Nebula in the Large Magellanic Cloud.  It is notable as the progenitor of supernova 1987A.

The star was originally charted by the Romanian-American astronomer Nicholas Sanduleak in 1970, but remained just a number in a catalogue until identified as the star that exploded in the first naked eye supernova since the invention of the telescope, when its maximum reached visual magnitude +2.8.

The discovery that a blue supergiant was a supernova progenitor contradicted all known theories at the time and produced a flurry of new ideas about how such a thing might happen, but it is now accepted that blue supergiants are a normal progenitor for some supernovae.

The candidate luminous blue variable HD 168625 possesses a bipolar nebula that is a close twin of that around Sk -69 202.  It is speculated that Sk -69 202 may have been a luminous blue variable in the recent past, although it was apparently a normal luminous supergiant at the time it exploded.

See also
Neutrino astronomy
List of supernovae
History of supernova observation

References

Stars in the Large Magellanic Cloud
Dorado (constellation)
B-type supergiants
Luminous blue variables
Large Magellanic Cloud
Extragalactic stars
Tarantula Nebula